Nadège Cissé (born 4 April 1997) is an Ivorian professional footballer. She was part of the Ivorian squad for the 2015 FIFA Women's World Cup.

See also
List of Ivory Coast women's international footballers

References

External links
 
 Profile at FIF 

1997 births
Living people
Ivorian women's footballers
Ivory Coast women's international footballers
Place of birth missing (living people)
Women's association football forwards
2015 FIFA Women's World Cup players
Ivorian expatriate footballers
Ivorian expatriate sportspeople in Belarus
Expatriate women's footballers in Belarus
FC Minsk (women) players